Rachel Bubar Kelly (November 22, 1922 — January 14, 2002) was the Prohibition Party candidate for United States Vice President in the 1996 presidential election as the running mate of Earl F. Dodge.  Dodge had in the past been the running mate of her brother Ben Bubar.

Kelly was a graduate of Colby College (1947) and a President of the Women's Christian Temperance Union.

References

1922 births
2002 deaths
Colby College alumni
1996 United States vice-presidential candidates
20th-century American politicians
Prohibition Party (United States) vice presidential nominees
Maine Prohibitionists
Female candidates for Vice President of the United States
20th-century American women politicians
Woman's Christian Temperance Union people
American temperance activists